

Arthropods

Newly named insects

Turtles

Archosauromorphs

Newly named birds

Newly named non-avian dinosaurs

Plesiosaurs

New taxa

Pterosaurs

New taxa

Synapsids

Non-mammalian

References

1870s in paleontology
Paleontology, 1870 In